Kot Najibullah railway station (Urdu,) is  located in Haripur district, Khyber Pakhtunkhwa,  Pakistan.

See also
 List of railway stations in Pakistan
 Pakistan Railways

References

External links

Railway stations in Haripur District